Fibroblast growth factor 1, (FGF-1) also known as acidic fibroblast growth factor (aFGF), is a growth factor and signaling protein encoded by the FGF1 gene.  It is synthesized as a 155 amino acid polypeptide, whose mature form is a non-glycosylated 17-18 kDa protein.  Fibroblast growth factor protein was first purified in 1975, but soon afterwards others using  different conditions isolated acidic FGF, Heparin-binding growth factor-1, and Endothelial cell growth factor-1.  Gene sequencing revealed that this group was actually the same growth factor and that FGF1 was a member of a family of FGF proteins.

FGF-1 has no definitive signal sequence and thus is not secreted through classical pathways, but it does appear to form a disulfide linked dimer inside cells that associate with a complex of proteins at the cell membrane (including S100A13 and Syt1) which then help flip it through the membrane to the exterior of the cell.  Once in the reducing conditions of the surrounding tissue, the dimer dissociates into monomeric FGF1 that can enter systemic circulation or be sequestered in tissues binding to heparan sulfate proteoglycans of the extracellular matrix. FGF1 can then bind to and exert its effects via specific fibroblast growth factor receptor (FGFR) proteins which themselves constitute a family of closely related molecules.

In addition to its extracellular activity, FGF1 can also function intracellularly. The protein has a nuclear localization sequence (NLS) but the route that FGF1 takes to get to the nucleus is unclear and it appears that some sort of cell surface receptor binding is necessary, followed by its internalization and translocation to the nucleus whereupon it can interact with nuclear isoforms of FGFRs.  This is different from FGF2 which also can activate nuclear FGFRs but has splicing variants of the protein that never leave the cell and go directly to the nucleus.

Function 

FGF family members possess broad mitogenic and cell survival activities, and are involved in a variety of biological processes, including embryonic development, cell growth, morphogenesis, tissue repair, tumor growth and invasion. This protein functions as a modifier of endothelial cell migration and proliferation, as well as an angiogenic factor. It acts as a mitogen for a variety of mesoderm- and neuroectoderm-derived cells in vitro, thus is thought to be involved in organogenesis. Three alternatively spliced variants encoding different isoforms have been described.

FGF1 is multifunctional with many reported effects.  For one example, in mice with diet-induced diabetes that is an experimental equivalent of type 2 diabetes in humans, a single injection of the FGF1 protein is enough to restore blood sugar levels to a healthy range for > 2 days.

Interactions 

FGF1 has been shown to interact with:

 CSNK2A2 
 CSNK2B 
 CSNK2A1 
 FIBP 
 FGFR1 
 FGFR2 
 FGFR3
 FGFR4 
 HSPA9  and
 S100A13 
 Synaptotagmin 1 (SYT1)

See also 
 Fibroblast growth factor

References

Further reading